Qaleh Sheykh (also Romanized as Qal‘eh Sheykh and Qal‘eh-ye Sheykh) is a village in Kahrizak Rural District, Kahrizak District, Ray County, Tehran Province, Iran. At the 2006 census, its population was 1,402, in 344 families.

References 

Populated places in Ray County, Iran